Ömerler is a village in the District of Karpuzlu, Aydın Province, Turkey. As of 2010 it had a population of 480 people.

References

Villages in Karpuzlu District